Salvini is an Italian surname that may refer to:
 Anton Maria Salvini (1653–1729), Italian naturalist and classicist 
 Emil Salvini, American historian/author/host of "Tales of the Jersey Shore" on NJ-TV
 Fanny Salvini-Donatelli (c.1815–1891), Italian operatic soprano
 Giorgio Salvini (1920–2015), Italian physicist
 Guido Salvini (disambiguation) - multiple people
 Matteo Salvini (born 1973), Italian politician and Senator of the Republic
 Sandro Salvini (1890–1955), Italian actor
 Salvino Salvini (1824–1899), Italian sculptor
 Tommaso Salvini (1829–1915), Italian actor

Italian-language surnames